is a Japanese footballer currently playing as a midfielder for SC Sagamihara.

Career statistics

Club
.

Notes

References

External links

 

2000 births
Living people
Association football people from Saga Prefecture
Japanese footballers
Japanese expatriate footballers
Association football midfielders
AD Alcorcón footballers
SC Sagamihara players
Japanese expatriate sportspeople in Spain
Expatriate footballers in Spain